This list is of Major Sites Protected for their Historical and Cultural Value at the National Level in the Province of Fujian, People's Republic of China.

 
  
 

  

 

 

|-
| Guandi Temple on Dongshan Island
| Dongshan Guan Di miao 东山关帝庙
| Dongshan County 东山县
| 4-144

 

 

 

 

 

  

|}

See also

 Principles for the Conservation of Heritage Sites in China

References

 
Fujian